The Ministry of Agriculture and Rural Development (MARD) is a government ministry responsible for rural development and the governance, promotion and nurturing of agriculture and the agriculture industry, in Vietnam.  The purview of the Ministry includes forestry, aquaculture, irrigation and the salt industry; it is also involved in water management and flood control.

The Ministry maintains 63 provincial department offices throughout Vietnam. The Ministry itself is located in Hanoi.

History
The Ministry of Agriculture and Rural Development has been developed since 1987 by the combination of different government ministries: Ministry of Agriculture, Ministry of Food, combined to the Ministry of Agriculture and Food Industry in 1987; the subsequent addition of the Ministry of Forestry and the Ministry of Irrigation to form today's Ministry; as well as the addition of the Ministry of Fisheries in 2007.  The Ministry was officially formed in 1995.

Organisation
The Ministry is organised into many work areas:

Organisations in charge of state management
 Planning Department
 Finance Department
 Science, Technology and Environment Department
 International Cooperation Department
 Legislation Department
 Personal and Organisation Department
 Ministerial Inspection
 MARD Office
 Department of Cultivation
 Plant Protection Department
 Department of Husbandry
 Veterinary/Animal Health Department
 Agro-forestry Processing and Salt Industry Department
 Forest Protection Department
 Vietnam Administration of Forestry (VNFOREST)
 Aqua Exploiting and Protection Department
 Department of Aquaculture
 Water Resource Department
 Dyke Management and Flood Control Department
 Works/Construction Department
 Cooperatives and Rural Development Department
 National Agro-aqua-forestry Quality Assurance Department
 Vietnam Directorate of Fisheries

Other
 Information Technology and Statistics Centre
 Centre for Clean Water and Sanitation
 National Agriculture Extension Centre
 Vietnam Agriculture Newspaper
 Agriculture and Rural Development Magazine
 Agricultural Publishing House One Member Company Limited

See also
 Agribusiness
 Agriculture in Vietnam
 Aquaculture and fishery
 Spiny lobster culture in Vietnam
 Vietnam fisheries patrol
 Economy of Vietnam
 Forestry and timberland
 Provinces of Vietnam
 Vietnam Bank for Agriculture and Rural Development

References

External links
 Ministry of Agriculture and Rural Development official site
 Ministry of Agriculture and Rural Development, directory of 64 provincial Departments of Agriculture and Rural Development (DARDs)

Agricultural organizations based in Vietnam
Vietnam
Vietnam
Forestry in Vietnam
Vietnam
Agriculture And Rural Development
Governmental office in Hanoi
Vietnam
Ministries established in 1995
Rural development ministries
1995 establishments in Vietnam